Bidens molokaiensis, the Molokai beggarticks, is a species of flowering plant in the family Asteraceae. It belongs to the genus Bidens, collectively called kokoolau or kookoolau in the Hawaiian language. It is found only on Molokai in the Hawaiian Islands.

It inhabits low shrublands and rocky shores. It is threatened by habitat loss due to the spread of invasive weeds, overgrazing, and brushfires.

References

molokaiensis
Endemic flora of Hawaii
Biota of Molokai
Plants described in 1888
Taxonomy articles created by Polbot